Ausserferrera is a village in Hinterrhein District in the Swiss Canton of Graubünden. An independent municipality before, it merged on January 1, 2008 with neighboring Innerferrera to form the municipality of Ferrera.

History
Ausserferrera is first mentioned in the middle 12th century as Farreira. In 1837 it separated from Innerferrera to become an independent municipality.

Geography

Of this area, 29.3% is used for agricultural purposes, while 20.4% is forested. Of the rest of the land, 0.5% is settled (buildings or roads) and the remainder (49.7%) is non-productive (rivers, glaciers or mountains).

The municipality is located in the Schams sub-district, of the Hinterrhein district. It is located on the Averser branch of the Rhein. It consists of the haufendorf (an irregular, unplanned and quite closely packed village, built around a central square) of Ausserferrera. In 2008 Ausserferrera merged with Innerferrera to form Ferrera.

Demographics
Ausserferrera has a population of 46, all Swiss.  Over the last 10 years the population has decreased at a rate of -24.6%.

, the gender distribution of the population was 54.3% male and 45.7% female. The age distribution, in Ausserferrera is; 6 people or 12.8% of the population are between 0 and 9 years old. No one is 10 to 19. Of the adult population, 4 people or 8.5% of the population are between 20 and 29 years old. 5 people or 10.6% are 30 to 39, 2 people or 4.3% are 40 to 49, and 8 people or 17.0% are 50 to 59. The senior population distribution is 6 people or 12.8% of the population are between 60 and 69 years old, 10 people or 21.3% are 70 to 79, there are 3 people or 6.4% who are 80 to 89, and there are 3 people or 6.4% who are 90 to 99.

In the 2007 Swiss federal election the most popular party was the SVP which received 91.7% of the vote.  The next three most popular parties were the FDP (8.3%), the CVP (0%) and the CVP (0%).

The entire Swiss population is generally well educated. In Ausserferrera about 80% of the population (between age 25–64) have completed either non-mandatory upper secondary education or additional higher education (either University or a Fachhochschule).

Ausserferrera has an unemployment rate of 0%. , there were 2 people employed in the primary economic sector and about 1 business involved in this sector.  people are employed in the secondary sector and there are  businesses in this sector. 9 people are employed in the tertiary sector, with 3 businesses in this sector.

The historical population is given in the following table:

Languages
Until 1950, the village was almost completely Romansh-speaking, but today it is almost completely German-speaking.
Most of the population speaks German (93.6%), with French being second most common ( 2.1%) and Italian being third ( 2.1%).

References

External links

Ferrera
Villages in Graubünden
Former municipalities of Graubünden